Ibar may refer to:

People
 Ibar of Beggerin (died 500), Irish saint
 Íbar of Killibar Beg, Irish saint
 Hilmi Ibar (born 1947), Kosovar academic
 José Ibar (born 1969), Cuban baseball player

Places
 Ibar District, a division of the Serbian Grand Principality
 Ibar (river), in Kosovo, Montenegro, Serbia
 Ibar Reserve in Rila, Bulgaria
 Ibar Rocks, a rock formation in Antarctica
 Ibar Highway, in Serbia

Other uses
 African Union Interafrican Bureau for Animal Resources (AU-IBAR)
 FK Ibar, a football club from Rožaje, Montenegro
 Olceclostera ibar, a moth in the family Bombycidae

See also
I-beam, a beam with an I- or H-shaped cross-section used for structural support in the construction industry